The Central District of Zarand County is a district (bakhsh) in Zarand County, Kerman Province, Iran. At the 2006 census, its population was 103,208, in 24,963 families.  The district has three cities: Zarand, Khanuk, and Reyhan Shahr. The district has eight rural districts (dehestan): Dasht-e Khak Rural District, Eslamabad Rural District, Hotkan Rural District, Jorjafak Rural District, Khanuk Rural District, Mohammadabad Rural District, Sarbanan Rural District, and Vahdat Rural District.

References 

Zarand County
Districts of Kerman Province